Ivan Borna Jelić Balta (born 17 September 1992) is a Croatian professional footballer who plays for Sarajevo, on loan from Wisła Kraków. Primarily a defensive midfielder, he can also play as a centre-back.

Club career
Born in Zagreb, Jelić Balta is a native of Bjelovar where he went through the school of the local NK Bjelovar, joining the ranks of the third-tier first team in 2010. After two seasons, he joined local rivals Mladost Ždralovi in the same tier, which ended up winning the 2012–13 season of the Croatian Third League.

After that, he played for lower division clubs in Germany until his return to Croatia. In July 2018, he signed a contract with a newly promoted Ukrainian Premier League club Arsenal Kyiv.

References

External links
 
 

1992 births
Living people
Footballers from Zagreb
Association football midfielders
Association football central defenders
Croatian footballers
NK Bjelovar players
Stuttgarter Kickers II players
NK Rudeš players
NK Varaždin (2012) players
FC Arsenal Kyiv players
FC Koper players
Wisła Kraków players
FK Sarajevo players
Second Football League (Croatia) players
Oberliga (football) players
First Football League (Croatia) players
Croatian Football League players
Ukrainian Premier League players
Slovenian Second League players
Slovenian PrvaLiga players
I liga players
Premier League of Bosnia and Herzegovina players
Croatian expatriate footballers
Expatriate footballers in Germany
Expatriate footballers in Ukraine
Expatriate footballers in Slovenia
Expatriate footballers in Poland
Expatriate footballers in Bosnia and Herzegovina
Croatian expatriate sportspeople in Germany
Croatian expatriate sportspeople in Ukraine
Croatian expatriate sportspeople in Slovenia
Croatian expatriate sportspeople in Poland
Croatian expatriate sportspeople in Bosnia and Herzegovina